Chicken à la King ('chicken in the style of King') is a dish consisting of diced chicken in a cream sauce, often with sherry, mushrooms, and vegetables, generally served over rice, noodles, or bread. It is also often served in a vol-au-vent or pastry case. It is sometimes made with tuna or turkey in place of chicken.

History

Various dishes of chicken "à la Reine" and "à la Royale" have appeared in cookbooks since as early as 1665, mostly without recipes; there is no indication that they are similar to the modern Chicken à la King.

Several competing accounts about its origin have circulated:

One claim is it was created by Delmonico's chef Charles Ranhofer as "Chicken à la Keene" in the 1880s, named after Foxhall Parker Keene.
Another version claims it was created in 1881 at Claridge's Hotel in London and named for James R. Keene, father of Foxhall. 
A third story is that the dish was devised in 1903 for Wolfram Mercy Keene, son of Foxhall and grandson of James.
A fourth, often disputed tale is that Chicken a la King was prepared for Dewberry William Keene, son of Wolfram, grandson of Foxhall, and great grandson of James.
Another account claims chef George Greenwald of the Brighton Beach Hotel in Brighton Beach created it in 1898, naming it after patron E. Clarke King II and his wife.
Another account is that chicken à la King was created in the 1890s by hotel cook William "Bill" King of the Bellevue Hotel in Philadelphia. Several obituaries in early March 1915 credited King after he died on March 4, 1915. A New York Tribune editorial at the time of King's death stated:The name of William King is not listed among the great ones of the earth. No monuments will ever be erected to his memory, for he was only a cook. Yet what a cook! In him blazed the fire of genius which, at the white heat of inspiration, drove him one day, in the old Bellevue, in Philadelphia, to combine bits of chicken, mushrooms, truffles, red and green peppers and cream in that delight-some mixture which ever after has been known as "Chicken a la King."

The recipe was mentioned in The New York Times in 1893, and early published recipes appeared in 1900 and 1905. Fannie Merritt Farmer included a recipe in her 1911 publication on catering. The Fannie Farmer Cookbook includes a recipe for Chicken à la King in the 1906 update. It was a popular dish during the middle to late 20th century.

References

External links
History of Poultry Dishes at What's Cooking America

American chicken dishes
Historical foods in American cuisine